Saturday Night Fever is the soundtrack album from the 1977 film Saturday Night Fever starring John Travolta. The soundtrack was released on November 15, 1977. Prior to the release of Thriller by Michael Jackson, Saturday Night Fever was the best-selling album in music history, and still ranks among the best-selling soundtrack albums worldwide, with sales figures of over 40 million copies.

In the United States, the album was certified 16× Platinum for shipments of at least 16 million units. The album stayed atop the charts for 24 straight weeks from January to July 1978 and stayed on Billboards album charts for 120 weeks until March 1980. Three singles from the album contributed by the Bee Gees—"How Deep Is Your Love", "Stayin' Alive" and "Night Fever"—along with Yvonne Elliman's "If I Can't Have You", all reached No. 1 in the US. In the UK, the album spent 18 consecutive weeks at No. 1. The album epitomized the disco phenomenon on both sides of the Atlantic and was an international sensation. The album has been added to the National Recording Registry in the Library of Congress in 2014 for being culturally significant.

Writing and recording
According to the DVD commentary for Saturday Night Fever, the producers intended to use the song "Lowdown" by Boz Scaggs in the rehearsal scene between Tony and Stephanie in the dance studio, and choreographed their dance moves to the song. However, representatives for Scaggs's label, Columbia Records, refused to grant legal clearance for it, as they wanted to pursue another disco movie project, which never materialized.  Composer David Shire, who scored the film, had to, in turn, write a song to match the dance steps demonstrated in the scene and eliminate the need for future legal hassles.  However, this track does not appear on the movie's soundtrack.

The Bee Gees's involvement in the film did not begin until post-production. As John Travolta asserted, "The Bee Gees weren't even involved in the movie in the beginning ... I was dancing to Stevie Wonder and Boz Scaggs."

Producer Robert Stigwood commissioned the Bee Gees to create the songs for the film. As Robin Gibb asserted:

The brothers wrote the songs "virtually in a single weekend" at Château d'Hérouville studio in France. The first song they recorded was "If I Can't Have You", but their version was not used in the film.

Barry Gibb remembered the reaction when Stigwood and music supervisor Bill Oakes arrived and listened to the demos:

Maurice Gibb recalled, "We played him demo tracks of 'If I Can't Have You', 'Night Fever' and 'More Than a Woman'. He asked if we could write it more discoey."

The Brothers Gibb then wrote a song called "Saturday Night" but as Maurice explains,  
The track was recorded at Criteria Studios, with Maurice Gibb playing a bass line similar to the guitar riff, Barry Gibb and Alan Kendall on guitar riffs, and Blue Weaver on synthesizers. Barry chose to sing falsetto on the whole song, except on the line "life’s going nowhere, somebody help me". Dennis Bryon, who was a backing drummer, left in the middle of the session due to the death of his mother. So the group looked for a replacement. 

However, as there was a shortage of qualified drummers in the area, they tried out a drum machine, with unsatisfactory results. After listening to the drum track of the already-recorded Night Fever, they took two bars from that track, and re-recorded them as a loop on a separate tape.

Release
The original issue of the album included the original studio version of "Jive Talkin; later LP pressings included a version culled from Here at Last ... Bee Gees ... Live. All CD releases have included the original "Jive Talkin. "Jive Talkin was to have been used in a deleted scene taking place the day after Tony Manero's first Saturday night at the disco, but as the sequence was cut for the final film, the song was cut as well. In addition to the Bee Gees songs, additional incidental music was composed and adapted by David Shire. Three of Shire's cues – "Manhattan Skyline", "Night on Disco Mountain" (based on the classical piece "Night on Bald Mountain") and "Salsation" – are included on the soundtrack album as well. Five additional cues – "Tony and Stephanie", "Near the Verrazano Bridge" (both adapted from the Bee Gees' song "How Deep Is Your Love"), "Barracuda Hangout", "Death on the Bridge" and "All Night Train" – while heard in the film, remain unreleased on CD. In 1995, the soundtrack was re-released on CD through Polydor Records. In 2006, the album was re-released on Reprise Records as part of the Bee Gees' regaining control of their master tapes.

To commemorate the movie's 40th anniversary, Capitol Records released a newly remastered version (However, CD 1 is the same remaster used for the 1995 Polydor release.) on April 21, 2017, with the original artwork and gatefold packaging.

On November 17, 2017, a deluxe box set was released with the original soundtrack, 4 new mixes of "Stayin' Alive", "Night Fever", "How Deep Is Your Love" and "You Should Be Dancing", a collector's book, art prints, a movie poster and a turntable mat.

Reception and legacy

Along with the success of the movie, the soundtrack, composed and performed primarily by the Bee Gees, is the second best-selling soundtrack album of all time. Saturday Night Fever had a large cultural impact in the United States. The Bee Gees had originally written and recorded five of the songs used in the film – "Stayin' Alive", "Night Fever", "How Deep Is Your Love", "More Than a Woman" (performed in the film in two different versions – one version by Tavares, and another by the Bee Gees) and "If I Can't Have You" (performed in the movie by Yvonne Elliman) as part of a regular album. They had no idea at the time they would be making a soundtrack and said that they basically lost an album in the process. Two previously released Bee Gees songs – "Jive Talkin and "You Should Be Dancing" – are also included on the soundtrack. Other previously released songs from the disco era round out the music in the movie.

The soundtrack won the Grammy Award for Album of the Year. It is the only disco album to do so, and one of only three soundtrack albums so honored. In 2012, the album was ranked No. 132 on Rolling Stone magazine's list of "The 500 Greatest Albums of All Time", ranked again in a 2020 revised list at number 163.  The soundtrack hit the No. 1 spot on the Billboard chart's Pop Album and Soul Album charts. In 2003 the TV network VH1 named it the 57th greatest album of all time, and it was ranked 80th in a 2005 survey held by British television's Channel 4 to determine the 100 greatest albums of all time. Pitchfork Media listed Saturday Night Fever as the 34th best album of the 1970s.

The album was added to the National Recording Registry in the Library of Congress on March 21, 2013 for preservation.

Track listing

Notes
 signifies arranged by

Additional songs recorded for the film but not used
"Emotion" by Samantha Sang – 3:43
"If I Can't Have You" by Bee Gees – 3:25
"(Our Love) Don't Throw It All Away" by Bee Gees – 4:07
"Warm Ride" by Bee Gees – 3:16

Personnel

Barry Gibb – lead, harmony and backing vocals, rhythm guitar (tracks 1–4, 12 & 13)
Robin Gibb – lead vocals (track 1 & 2), harmony and backing vocals (tracks 1–4, 12 & 13)
Maurice Gibb – bass, harmony and backing vocals (tracks 1–4, 12 & 13)
Alan Kendall – electric guitar (tracks 1–4, 12 & 13)
Blue Weaver – keyboards, synthesizer, piano (tracks 1–4, 12 & 13)
Dennis Bryon – drums, percussion (tracks 1–4, 12 & 13)
Joe Lala – percussion (tracks 1–4)
Wade Marcus – string arrangements (track 2)
Stephen Stills – percussion (track 13)
Mike Baird – drums (track 10)
Michael Boddicker – synthesizer (tracks 8 & 10)
Bob Bowles – guitar (tracks 5 & 7)
Dennis Budimir – guitar (track 10)
Sonny Burke – piano (tracks 5, 7 & 8); electric keyboards (track 15)
Eddie Cano – acoustic piano (track 15)
Mike Caruso – guitar (track 6)
Paulinho da Costa – percussion (tracks 5 & 7)
Scott Edwards – bass (tracks 5, 10 & 15)
Steve Forman – percussion (tracks 8, 10 & 15)
James Gadson – drums (tracks 5, 7 & 8)
Ralph Grierson – keyboards (track 10)
Mitch Hoder – guitar (track 8)
Abraham Laboriel – bass (track 8)
Freddie Perren – synthesizer, keyboards, percussion (track 5)
Emil Richards – percussion (track 10)
Jerome Richardson – flute solo (track 15)
Lee Ritenour – guitar (tracks 8, 10 & 15)
David Shire – adaptation (track 10)
Mark Stevens – drums (track 15)
Chino Valdez – congas (track 15)
Bob Zimmitti – percussion (tracks 5, 7 & 15)
John Tobler – liner notes
Bill Oakes – compilation, album supervision

Awards

Grammy Awards

|-
| width="35" align="center" |1978 ||"How Deep Is Your Love" ||Best Pop Vocal Performance by a Group || 
|-
| width="35" align="center" rowspan=4 |1979 || Saturday Night Fever || Album of the Year ||
|-
|Saturday Night Fever ||   Best Pop Vocal Performance by a Duo or Group || 
|-
|"Stayin' Alive" ||Best Arrangement of Voices || 
|-
|Barry Gibb, Albhy Galuten, Karl Richardson (producers) ||Producer of the Year || 
|-
| width="35" align="center" | 2004 || Saturday Night Fever || Hall of Fame Award || 
|-

American Music Awards

|-
| width="35" align="center" | 1979 || Saturday Night Fever ||Favorite Soul/R&B album || 
|-

Charts

Weekly charts

Year-end charts

Decade-end charts

Certifications and sales

See also
 List of best-selling albums
 List of best-selling albums by country
 List of best-selling albums in Belgium
 List of best-selling albums in France
 List of best-selling albums in Germany
 List of best-selling albums in Italy
 List of best-selling albums in Mexico
 List of best-selling albums in the United States
 List of diamond-certified albums in Canada
 List of number-one albums of 1978 (U.S.)
 List of number-one R&B albums of 1978 (U.S.)
 Sesame Street Fever

References

External links
Album online on Radio3Net a radio channel of Romanian Radio Broadcasting Company
Saturday Night Fever on Discogs

1977 soundtrack albums
Bee Gees albums
Polydor Records soundtracks
RSO Records soundtracks
Reprise Records soundtracks
United States National Recording Registry recordings
Disco soundtracks
Grammy Award for Album of the Year
Juno Award for International Album of the Year albums
Drama film soundtracks
Various artists albums
United States National Recording Registry albums